The following outline is provided as an overview of and topical guide to Korean language: 

The Korean language is an East Asian language spoken by about 80 million people. It is a member of the Koreanic language family and is the official and national language of both Koreas: North Korea and South Korea, with different standardized official forms used in each country. It is also one of the two official languages in the Yanbian Korean Autonomous Prefecture and Changbai Korean Autonomous County of Jilin province, China. Historical and modern linguists classify Korean as a language isolate; however, it does have a few extinct relatives, which together with Korean itself and the Jeju language (spoken in the Jeju Province and considered somewhat distinct) form the Koreanic language family. This implies that Korean is not an isolate, but a member of a micro-family. The idea that Korean belongs to the controversial Altaic language family is discredited in academic research. Korean is agglutinative in its morphology and SOV in its syntax.

Korean language –

What type of thing is Korean language? 

Korean language can be described as all of the following:

Language
Language isolate
Koreanic language

Dialects of Korean language 

Korean dialects
Chungcheong dialect
Gangwon dialect
Gyeonggi dialect 
Gyeongsang dialect  
Hamgyŏng dialect 
Hwanghae dialect
Jeju language
Jeolla dialect
Koryo-mar
North Korean standard language
North–South differences in the Korean language
Pyongan dialect
South Korean standard language
Zainichi Korean language

History of the Korean language 
Old Korean
Middle Korean
Modern Korean
Stele of Bongseon Honggyeongsa
Linguistic purism in Korean

General Korean language concepts 

Korean count word
Korean dialects 
Korean grammar
Korean language and computers
Korean manual alphabet
Korean numerals
Korean postpositions  
Korean profanity 
Korean pronouns
Korean punctuation
Korean speech levels
Korean verbs
Korean phonology
List of Korean placename etymologies
Hangul
Hanja
Korean honorifics

Korean dictionaries 

Basic Korean Dictionary
Han-Han Dae Sajeon
Standard Korean Language Dictionary

Hangul 

Cia-Cia language
Dongguk Jeongun
Hangul
Hangul Day
Hangul supremacy
Hangul Syllables
Hunminjeongeum
Hunminjeongeum Haerye
Hunminjeongeum Society
Korean calligraphy
Korean Language Society
KS X 1001
National Hangeul Museum
Origin of Hangul
Hangul orthography
SKATS
Taiwanese Hangul
Unified Hangul Code
Yongbieocheonga

Korean language organizations 

International Circle of Korean Linguistics
International Ideographs Core
King Sejong Institute
Korean Cultural Center

Korean language media

Korean books 

The Art of Mathematics
Ddakjibon novels
Domundaejak
Dongguk Jeongun
Gyeongguk daejeon
Haedong Goseungjeon
Muyesinbo
Nongsa jikseol
Sarye pyeollam
The Scientists (book)
Shouting out to the World!
Suunjapbang
The Jehol Diary

Manhwa 

Manhwa
Ability (manhwa)
Cartoon Street
Girls of the Wild's
Lezhin Comics
Seoul Animation Center
Treasure Hunting (series)

Korean encyclopedias 

Doosan Encyclopedia
The Encyclopaedia of Korea
Encyclopedia of Korean Culture
Encyclopedia of Life
Global World Encyclopedia
Great Korean Encyclopedia
Gyuhap chongseo
Ichpedia
Jibong yuseol
Kwangmyong Encyclopedia

Korean-language websites 

Baidu Baike
DMOZ
DPRK Today
Inform Napalm
Korean Wikipedia
Wikitravel

Persons influential in Korean language

Koreanists 

Alexander Argüelles
Charles K. Armstrong
Robert Buswell Jr.
Yang Hi Choe-Wall
Mózes Csoma
Martina Deuchler
Carter Eckert
The Encyclopaedia of Korea
James Scarth Gale
Stephan Haggard
James Hoare
List of Russian Koreanists
Nikolai Kuehner
Andrei Lankov
John Wilson Lewis
Fred Lukoff
George M. McCune
Robert M. Oppenheim
Shimpei Cole Ota
Pak Noja
James Palais
Keith Pratt
Stephen Revere
Richard Rutt
Andre Schmid (academic)
William E. Skillend
Roger Tennant
Sem Vermeersch

Korean–English translators 

Brother Anthony
Choi Byong-hyon
Heinz Insu Fenkl
J. Martin Holman
Chi-young Kim
Hae Jong Kim
James Kimbrell
Deborah Smith (translator)

Korean words and phrases 
List of English words of Korean origin
Aegyo
Ajumma
Anju (food)
Bak Jiwon
Bang (Korean)
Bojagi
Bon-gwan
Boseulachi
Bureom
Byeonsa
Chaebol
Chemical elements in East Asian languages
Chinilpa
Chumchurum
Daeboreum
Dobok
Dokkaebi
Eopsin
Etymology of the Korean currencies
Gireogi appa
Gogok
Gongsandang
Gosu
Gungmindang
Gwisin
Gyeyang
Han (cultural)
Hanok
Hell Joseon
Homi (tool)
Hopae
Hwabyeong
Hwarang
Hyeon
Hyeong
Inminban
Jaesusaeng
Jinbodang
Jjokbari
Kkangpae
Kkonminam
Manhwabang
Minjung
Mogyoktang
Mu (negative)
Munjeon Bonpuri
Namhan
Namsan
Nodongdang
Nunchi
Paiting
Pansori gosu
PC bang
List of Korean placename etymologies
Pyeong
Sampo generation
Seonbi
Simgumdo
Sinmindang
Socialtainer
Sogak
Sojunghwa
Songun
Ssireum
Taegeuk
Talchum
Ten thousand years
Ttaemiri
Tujeon
Ulzzang

References

External links 

Korean language
Korean language
Korean language